Anthony Glacier is a glacier which flows in an east-southeast direction to the east coast of Palmer Land where it terminates opposite the south tip of Hearst Island. The upper part of this glacier was seen by a sledge party of the British Graham Land Expedition under John Riddoch Rymill in 1936–37. The glacier was seen from the seaward side in 1940 by a sledging party from the East Base of the United States Antarctic Service, and in 1947 was photographed from the air by the Ronne Antarctic Research Expedition (RARE). It was named by Finn Ronne for Alexander Anthony of the J.P. Stevens Company, New York City, which contributed windproof clothing to the RARE.

Mount Martin sits immediately north of the head of the glacier.

See also
 List of glaciers in the Antarctic
 Glaciology

References

Glaciers of Palmer Land